Union councils of Narail District are the smallest rural administrative and local government units in Narail District of Bangladesh. The district consists of 1 municipalities, 3 upazilas, 39 union porishods and 651 villages.

Narail Sadar Upazila
Narail Sadar Upazila is divided into Narail Municipality and 13 union parishads, The union parishads are subdivided into 180 mauzas and 231 villages, 9 wards and 24 mahallas.
 Maijpara Union
 Hobkhali Union 
 Chandiborpur Union
 Auria Union
 Shahabad Union
 Tularampur Union
 Sheikhati Union
 Kalora Union
 Singasholpur Union
 Bhadrabila Union
 Banshgram Union
 Bisali Union
 Mulia Union

Lohagara Upazila
Lohagara Upazila has 12 union parishads, 154 mauzas and 217 villages, 9 wards and 24 [[Mahalla.

 Naldi Union
 Lahuria Union
 Shalnagar Union
 Noagram Union
 Lakshmipasha Union
 Joypur Union
 Lohagara Union
 Dighalia Union
 Mallikpur Union
 Kotakol Union
 Itna Union
 Kashipur Union

Kalia Upazila
Kalia Upazila has 14 union parishads, 111 mauzas, 187 villages, 9 wards and 19 mahallas.
 Babra Hasla Union
 Purulia Union
 Hamidpur Union
 Mauli Union
 Salamabad Union
 Khasial Union
 Joynagar Union
 Kalabaria Union
 Baioshona Union
 Pahardanga Union
 Perali Union
 Chanchuri Union
 Boronal Eliasabad Union
 Panchgram Union

References 

Local government in Bangladesh